Henry Horne is an American former basketball player known for his college career at Lafayette College. A native of Piscataway, New Jersey, Horne played for three seasons for the Lafayette Leopards (1972–75). In his senior year, Horne averaged 11.3 points, 11.4 rebounds, and 1.9 assists per game while helping lead them to an East Coast Conference West Division championship. He was named to the All-ECC First Team and was ECC co-Player of the Year with American's Wilbur Thomas.

Horne never played professionally, instead opting for a lifelong career in education administration.

References

External links
Henry Horne @ sports-reference.com

1950s births
Living people
American men's basketball players
Basketball players from New Jersey
Centers (basketball)
Lafayette Leopards men's basketball players
Piscataway High School alumni
People from Piscataway, New Jersey
Power forwards (basketball)
Sportspeople from Middlesex County, New Jersey